Triumphs of a Man Called Horse is a 1983 Western film directed by John Hough and written by Ken Blackwell and Carlos Aured. It is the second and final sequel to  A Man Called Horse (1970), following The Return of a Man Called Horse (1976). Richard Harris reprises his role as the titular character, starring with Michael Beck, Ana De Sade, Vaughn Armstrong, Anne Seymour, and Buck Taylor.

Released theatrically by Jensen Farley Pictures, it received generally negative reviews, with critics negatively comparing it to its predecessors.

Plot
Now in his 60s, Man Called Horse is the chief of the Sioux and is much hated by white men because "many's a white man's died from the tricks he taught the Sioux". The government calls Horse to peace talks, but a mysterious person-in-hiding with a rifle assassinates Horse and his bodyguard after the meeting.

His son Koda, who was raised among the Sioux, but was sent away to attend school in the East, returns to deal both with white settlers encroaching on the Sioux lands and with his own people, who want to go to war. Koda also meets an attractive young woman named Red Wing who happens to be a Crow, the traditional enemy of the Sioux. In the end, it is revealed that Horse was murdered by a phony preacher who wanted to start a war so he could get the Sioux's land. Koda and Red Wing have a traditional showdown with the preacher and his henchmen, with Koda and Red Wing victorious. At the end, Koda sees the triumphant spirit of his father in full chief regalia.

Cast
 Richard Harris as Shunkawakan / John Morgan
 Michael Beck as Koda
 Ana De Sade as Redwing
 Vaughn Armstrong as Captain Cummings
 Anne Seymour as Elk Woman
 Buck Taylor as Sgt. Bridges
 Lautaro Murúa as Perkins
 Simón Andreu as Grance
 Roger Cudney as Durand
 Jerry Gatlin as Winslow
 John Davis Chandler as Mason
 Miguel Ángel Fuentes as Big Bear
 Sebastian Ligarde as Mullins
 Erika Carlsson as Essie
 Anaís de Melo as Dorothy

Production
An international co-production film between The United States, Mexico, Spain and Canada. Richard Harris' first choice to direct was Sam Peckinpah, with whom he had previously worked with on Major Dundee (1965). Due to Peckinpah's infamously erratic behavior, he was replaced by John Hough. This was the veteran director's first and only Western.

Like its two predecessors, Triumphs was shot primarily in Sonora and Chihuahua, Mexico, with additional photography taking place in Spain and second unit photography in Red Lodge, Montana.

Reception
TV Guide gave the film one star: "This rip-off sequel to A Man Called Horse (1970) and The Return of a Man Called Horse (1976) cashes in on the popularity of its predecessors. Richard Harris appears briefly as the "Man Called Horse", an aging Englishman who has headed a Sioux tribe for 30 years...The film is anything but a triumph".

References

External links
 

1982 films
1982 Western (genre) films
American Western (genre) films
American sequel films
Canadian Western (genre) films
Canadian sequel films
Mexican Western (genre) films
Mexican sequel films
Spanish Western (genre) films
Spanish sequel films
Films about Native Americans
Films based on works by Dorothy M. Johnson
1980s English-language films
1980s American films
1980s Canadian films
1980s Mexican films